The Ram Folk Club was a folk club in the borough of Elmbridge in suburban north Surrey, one of only a few folk clubs in the Home Counties close to London. Established in October 1983, it operated on Friday evenings and featured music by folk and acoustic artists and bands. It was run by a small group of regular musicians and fans and was not for profit. The evening usually consisted of a main 'guest' preceded by several floor spots. In 2007, the Club received the BBC Radio 2 Folk Club of the Year award. In March 2021, having not operated throughout the COVID-19 pandemic, it announced its permanent closure.

Performances
The club had a wide variety of guests, from local bands to national or international musicians. They included Phil Beer, Archie Fisher, Martin Carthy and John Kirkpatrick.

Venues

Originally known as the Greyhound Folk Club, the club's first events were  held at a pub in Weston Green. The club moved in 1985 to a pub in Weybridge and became the Hand and Spear Folk Club. It took on The Ram Club name when it moved in 1987 to a Young's Brewery pub in Claygate.

From 2009 the Ram Folk Club  held its folk music events at the Old Cranleighan Sports Club in Thames Ditton, midway between Kingston upon Thames, London and Walton on Thames. This was the club's fourth venue in Elmbridge and is only  from the original venue in Weston Green.

In March 2021, having not operated throughout the Covid-19 pandemic, the Club announced its permanent closure.

References

External links
 The Ram Club

1983 establishments in England
2021 disestablishments in England
Borough of Elmbridge
Clubs and societies in Surrey
Folk music venues
Music venues in Surrey
Organizations established in 1983
Organizations disestablished in 2021